ʻAbd al-Khāliq (ALA-LC romanization of ) is a Muslim male given name and, in modern usage, surname. It is built from the Arabic words ʻabd and al-Khāliq, one of the names of God in the Qur'an, which give rise to the Muslim theophoric names. It means "servant of the Creator".

It may refer to:

 Abdul Khaliq Gajadwani (died 1179), Central Asian Sufi teacher
 Abdel Khaliq Sarwat Pasha (1873 - 1928), Egyptian politician
 Abdul Khalek Hassouna (1898-1992), Egyptian diplomat
 Abdelkhalek Torres (1910-1970), Moroccan journalist and nationalist leader
 Abdel Khaliq Mahjub (1927-1971), Sudanese politician
 Abdul Khaleque (1927–2013), first Inspector General of Bangladesh Police 
 Abdul Khalik Juad (born 1930), Iraqi weightlifter
 Abdul Khaliq (athlete) (1933-1988), Pakistani sprinter
 Talukder Abdul Khaleque,  Bangladeshi politician and the mayor of Khulna City Corporation
 Abdul Khaleque (Assamese politician) (born 1971), Indian politician
 Asad Abdul-Khaliq (born 1980), American football player
 Abdul Khaliq Hussaini, Afghan politician
 Yuvan Shankar Raja, Indian musician
Abdul Khaliq (cricketer)

See also
 Abdul Khaliq Hazara (disambiguation)

References

Arabic masculine given names